Gazabad may refer to:
 Gazabad, Anbarabad, Kerman Province
 Gazabad, Dowlatabad, Jiroft County, Kerman Province
 Gazabad, Khatunabad, Jiroft County, Kerman Province
 Gazabad, Qaleh Ganj, Kerman Province
 Gazabad-e Manuchehri, Kerman Province
 Gazabad-e Yek, Kerman Province
 Gazabad, North Khorasan
 Gazabad, Qom